Aros Bay is an embayment of ocean waters near the southeast of Islay, Scotland.

See also
 Claggain Bay

Line notes

References
 Alexander Murray (publisher). 1866. Scotland described: a series of topographical sketches. page 244

Landforms of Islay
Bays of Argyll and Bute